Hermann Sehrig (born 1892 in Karlsruhe; 1963 in Neuss) German Sculptor and Painter.

Apart from his activity as teacher for art, particularly for ceramic(s) he painted in oil and Pastels, as painter, furthermore a sculptor. In 1933 he had built together with his wife, the artist Else Sehrig-Vehling, his own atelier in Düsseldorf.(Hetjens Museum: German ceramic(s) of the 20th Century)

Biography 
 1892 Born in Karlsruhe
 1910 - 14 Düsseldorf, Kunstgewerbeschule
 1914 - 18 Soldier
 1918 - 21 Düsseldorf, Staatlichen Kunstakademie (Art-Academy of Düsseldorf)
 1921 - 25 Düsseldorf, Staatliche Kunstakademie, in the Atelier of Wiegmann
 1921 - 23 Master Student of Prof. Ederer
 1923 Köln, University,
 1925 Düsseldorf, own atelier together with his wife Else Sehrig-Vehling
 1928 Mülheim/Ruhr, moved his atelier
 1933 Mülheim, Teacher for Art
 1943 Straßfurt, Teacher
 1944 - 45 Magdeburg, School of Art, Leader of the Ceramic Department
 1945 - 52 Straßfurt, head master
 1952 - 55 Mülheim, Teacher
 1957 - 61 Düsseldorf and San Nazzaro/Swiss
 1961 - 63 Neuss
 1963 died

Works in Public Collections 
 Mülheim
 Städtisches Museum Münster
 Landesmuseum Düsseldorf
 Hetjens-Museum (Deutsches Keramikmuseum)

Publications 
 Dr. Hendel, Neue Arbeiten Mülheimer Künstler, Die Dezember-Ausstellung im Mülheimer Museum, in: Rhein- und Ruhrzeitung Nr. 582, 13.12.1929
 Werner Kruse, Keramiken von Hermann Sehrig, in: Keramische Rundschau 39, 1931, S. 229f.
 Revue moderne, Paris 1936, Nr. 10
 Ebenda (1.Mai) 1955
 Walter Quix, Künstler, Dichter, Literaten, in: Mülheimer Jahrbuch 1954, S.65ff. (Sehrig S. 73)
 G.K. Ommer, Der Passionsgedanke in den Werken Mülheimer Künstler, in: Mülheimer Tageblatt 82, 7. April 1955
 Meister angewandter Kunst, Maler, Keramiker und Lehrer Hermann Sehrig gestorben, in: Ruhr-Nachrichten Nr. 281, 5. Dezember 1963

German Expressionist painters
20th-century German painters
20th-century German male artists
German male painters
1963 deaths
1892 births